The Wildcat APC (Armoured personnel carrier) is an MRAP vehicle made by Israel Military Industries. Its chassis is based on the Tatra 4x4 platform.

See also 
 Golan Armored Vehicle
 COMBATGUARD

References

Military vehicles of Israel
Armored fighting vehicles of the United States
Armoured personnel carriers of Israel
Armoured fighting vehicles of the post–Cold War period